Memana is a rural locality on Flinders Island in the local government area of Flinders in the North-east region of Tasmania. The 2016 census determined a population of 102 for the state suburb of Memana.

History
Memana was gazetted as a locality in 1955.

Geography
Bass Strait forms the north-eastern and eastern boundaries.

Road infrastructure
The C803 route (Memana Road / Lackrana Road) enters from the south-west and runs north-east to the centre of the locality, where it turns south-east and exits to the south. Route C801 (Lucks Road / Melrose Road) starts at an intersection with C803 and runs north and west before exiting. Route C804 (Summer Camp Road) is a loop road from and to C803 in the centre of the locality.

References

Flinders Island
Towns in Tasmania